Cirripectes fuscoguttatus, the spotted blenny, is a species of combtooth blenny found in coral reefs in the Pacific ocean.  This species reaches a length of  TL.

References

fuscoguttatus
Fish described in 1953